The year 1720 in architecture involved some significant events.

Events
First Prix de Rome in architecture awarded in France to Antoine Derizet.
Nobile Teatro di San Giacomo di Corfù converted into a theatre.

Buildings and structures

Buildings

 Massachusetts Hall (Harvard University) is completed.
 Rebuilding of All Saints Church, Oxford (in The High) is completed to designs by Henry Aldrich with tower and spire probably by Nicholas Hawksmoor.
 213 and 215 King's Road, Chelsea, London.
 Baroque remodelling of the Church of the Teutonic Order, Vienna, probably by Anton Erhard Martinelli.
 Church of the Presentation of the Virgin in the Temple in Bârsana, Romania (one of the wooden churches of Maramureș).
 Replacement wooden Holy Trinity Church, Zhovkva, Ukraine.
 Schloss Bruchsal in Baden is commissioned from Anselm von Grünstein.

Births
 March 22 – Nicolas-Henri Jardin, French architect (d. 1799)
 October 4 – Giovanni Battista Piranesi, Italian etcher of architectural views (d. 1778)
 November 30 – André Soares, Portuguese sculptor and architect (d. 1769)

Deaths

architecture
Years in architecture
18th-century architecture